Miscanthus floridulus, the Pacific Island silvergrass, is a species of perennial grass in the family Poaceae.

Use 
In the Highlands Region of Papua New Guinea, this grass is locally known as pit pit grass, and grows naturally. The local communities use the stem of this grass for several purposes. The matured stem is used to make fences around gardens. It is also used to construct the outer wall of traditional houses. The third important use is that remote households burn dried stems to light their houses. Also, children who walk to school carry torches from the burning stem of this grass until they reach their destination. The walking distance is long where the children start their journey as early as 5 am.

References

 

floridulus
Grasses of Asia
Grasses of Oceania